Sarurpur Kalan, or Saroorpur Kalan, is a large village located about  north of Baghpat, in Baghpat district, Uttar Pradesh state, India. It is located halfway between Baghpat and Baraut. Towns nearby include Murthal and Rai to the west, Kutana to the north, and Daula to the east.

Demographics
Sarurpur Kalan is a large village with a population of approximately 13,000 people and has an approximate voting count of 9,400. The village has a 75% literacy rate and is mostly inhabited by traders and farmers. The religious population is made up of Hindus (mainly Jaats of Nain klan), Muslims and Jains. There is no reported religious disharmony within the village.

Facilities
'Gufa Wala Mandir' is situated near Sarurpur. In addition to Gufa Mandir, there three Hindu temples, one Jain temple, and two mosques. There is one government inter college and multiple private schools available for primary and intermediate level studies. A B.Ed. college recognized by CCS University is also available in the village. State Bank of India (SBI), Syndicate Bank, and a post office run services available to the villagers. There is one government hospital and multiple private clinics, run mainly by BAMS and BHMS, that provide medical services.

Economy
Bricks-making facilities (brick kilns) are the main trade of the village in addition to agriculture. There is a market in the village that is run mainly by Jains. There are also a considerable number of people working in the government sector including teachers, Army, Air Force, Delhi Police, and Uttar Pradesh Police. In last two Uttar Pradesh Police constable enrollment examinations, Sarurpur Kalan has been the number one village in the state for the number of candidates who qualified for the examination.

References

Villages in Bagpat district